Varnu is a village in Kutch District, Gujarat, India

Varnu or Varṇu may also refer to:

 Varṇu, an archaic name for the city of Bannu, Khyber Pakhtunkhwa, Pakistan

See also
 Varana (disambiguation)
 Varna (disambiguation)
 Varnum (disambiguation)